Odrzywół may refer to the following places:
Odrzywół, Przysucha County in Masovian Voivodeship (east-central Poland)
Odrzywół, Warsaw West County in Masovian Voivodeship (east-central Poland)
Odrzywół, Świętokrzyskie Voivodeship (south-central Poland)